The First National Bank Building, originally the Paintsville National Bank, is a historic structure located in Paintsville, Kentucky. The bank opened on May 5, 1902, and was added to the National Register of Historic Places on January 26, 1989.

References

National Register of Historic Places in Johnson County, Kentucky
Bank buildings on the National Register of Historic Places in Kentucky
1902 establishments in Kentucky
Commercial buildings completed in 1902
Romanesque Revival architecture in Kentucky
Paintsville, Kentucky